Joe Cheung Tung-cho is a Hong Kong director, producer, scriptwriter and actor.

Filmography

As director
 The Incredible Kung Fu Master (1979)
 Killer Wears White (1980)
 Dan bo dan (1981)
 Pom Pom (1984)
 Feng liu zhong (1984)
 Xiao sheng you liao (1984)
 Kai xin shuang xiang pao (1985)
 Rosa (1986)
 Flaming Brothers (1987)
 Huo wu feng yun (1988)
 Hao nu shi ba jia (1988)
 Hong Kong Corruptor (1990)
 The Banquet (1991)
 Pom Pom and Hot Hot (1992)
 The True Hero (1994)
 My Dad Is a Jerk! (1997)
 Kung Fu Wing Chun (2010)

As actor
 Poker King (2009) - Fernado
 ICAC Investigators 2009 (2009) (TV series)
 Merry-Go-Round (2010)
 ICAC Investigators 2011 (2011)
 Z Storm (2014)
 Gangster Payday (2014)
 Kung Fu Jungle (2014)
 Little Big Master (2015)
 S Storm (2016)
 No. 1 Chung Ying Street (2018)

References

External links
 
 HK cinemagic entry

Hong Kong film directors
Hong Kong male actors
Living people
Hong Kong screenwriters
1944 births